The A725 road in Scotland is a major route which is a trunk road dual carriageway for almost its whole length, connecting several of the large towns of North Lanarkshire and South Lanarkshire, linking the M8 and M74 motorways; it has been upgraded frequently since its construction, with the most recent major work completed in 2017. In combination with the A726 road which meets the M77 motorway, it forms a southern and eastern bypass for the city of Glasgow.

Route and history

Bellshill Bypass
The northern section of the A725 begins to the east of Glasgow in Coatbridge town centre where it meets the A89; it runs south through the Whifflet and Shawhead neighbourhoods, then links with the A8 and M8 (Junction 7A) in a complex, partially grade-separated junction at Shawhead and travels south past Bellshill, flanked by two large industrial estates that have a dedicated exit, with additional exits at Belziehill for central Bellshill and Viewpark (A721), and for Orbiston. This was the first section of the route to be developed, completed in 1968. It links with the M74 at Junction 5 (Raith Interchange) near Strathclyde Country Park, in a triple-layer junction with a stacked roundabout.

The Raith Interchange was considerably upgraded between 2014 and 2017 to address traffic congestion issues, with the A725 – which previously directed all traffic into a roundabout – now running beneath both the roundabout and the M74 and only those vehicles changing route required to join the roundabout.

East Kilbride Expressway
The A725 continues as the East Kilbride Expressway, a dual carriageway running south-west around Bothwell, crossing over the River Clyde then immediately dipping under the historic Bothwell Bridge, through High Blantyre (with exits for the A724 (Low Blantyre / Burnbank), Hamilton, and the University of the West of Scotland campus) on to Nerston in the north of East Kilbride. There, it links with the A749 (which runs to Rutherglen and south-eastern Glasgow) at the Whirlies Roundabout – a short spur was constructed between the two roads in the 1990s to bypass the Whirlies and ease congestion. It then heads south as the 'Kingsway' between the Calderwood and East Mains neighbourhoods towards the town centre and terminates where it meets the A726 (its section within East Kilbride referred to as the 'Queensway') at Birniehill roundabout near St Leonard's.

This southern section was completed in two parts; the 'Kingsway' within East Kilbride was completed as part of the work to transform the small settlement into a New Town in 1957, with the remaining section between the town and the Raith Interchange completed in stages between 1967 and 1983.

References

External links

A725, SABRE

Roads in Scotland
Transport in North Lanarkshire
Transport in South Lanarkshire
East Kilbride
Coatbridge
Bellshill
Blantyre, South Lanarkshire